Gavril Blajek (born 23 July 1939) is a Romanian water polo player. He competed in the men's tournament at the 1960 Summer Olympics.

References

1939 births
Living people
Romanian male water polo players
Olympic water polo players of Romania
Water polo players at the 1960 Summer Olympics
People from Brad, Hunedoara